Kalai may refer to:

People
 Adam Tauman Kalai, American computer scientist
 Ehud Kalai, prominent American game theorist and mathematical economist
 Gil Kalai (born 1955), Henry and Manya Noskwith Professor of Mathematics at the Hebrew University of Jerusalem
 Hanoch Kalai (1910–1979), member of Irgun and Lehi and an expert on the Hebrew language
 Iosif Kalai (born 1980), Romanian football player of Hungarian ethnicity
 Leslie Kalai (born 1984), Papua New Guinean footballer who is a goalkeeper
 Yael Tauman Kalai, Israeli-American cryptographer

Places
 Kalai, Iran, village in Gilan Province, Iran
 Kalai, Cambodia, commune in Ou Chum District in northeast Cambodia
 Kalai Upazila, Upazila of Joypurhat District in the Division of Rajshahi, Bangladesh

Other uses
 Kaivantha Kalai, a 2006 South Indian Tamil film written and directed by Pandiarajan
 Kalai Arasi, a 1963 Tamil-language adventure science fiction-comedy film
 Kalai (process), a metalworking process
 Koloi or Kalai, a scheduled tribe in Tripura, India
 Varma kalai, a martial art and esoteric healing art originating from ancient Tamil Nadu in South India